Solariella marshalli is an extinct species of sea snail, a marine gastropod mollusk, in the family Solariellidae.

Distribution
This species occurs in New Zealand.

References

Solariellidae